Port of St. Andrews is a port in Panama City, Florida

History 
Bay County was established from Washington County in 1913 and named for St. Andrew Bay, which borders the county. During World War II, Panama City developed as a shipbuilding and industrial center.

Current service

References 

Panama City, Florida
Ports and harbors of the Florida Gulf coast